Kerchoonz was a social networking website  founded in April 2005 and launched live in June 2008. Kerchoonz has been described as "A modern Record Deal" for bands and artists. Music fans have access to music for free and the bands get paid for each stream listened to via an advertising share that they receive from the site. Bands can also sell their music directly from their profile player and set the price for their own download sales.  Users can create free accounts in the following categories: Fan, Artist, Record Label, DJ, Industry Pro or Writer were connected to labels, managers, publishers, venues, vendors, promotors and more. It was the first company in the world that paid musicians for downloads and streams of their music via advertising revenue and via a subscription model. Kerchoonz was a global marketplace that connected bands and artists to record labels, managers, venues, vendors and offered an online shop for bands, allowing bands to sell their digital downloads and their physical CDs, T-shirts and gear through their own social networking profile on the site as well as in K-Ching, an on-line direct sale and auction marketplace. Kerchoonz was monetized via a subscription model, advertising model and commissions on transactions within the marketplace. Regular non-artist members can also sell used and new items on K-Ching and set up a store on their Kerchoonz profile. First online digital company that paid artist for streams

Kerchoonz offered an online shop for bands, allowing bands to sell their digital downloads and their physical CDs, T-shirts and gear through their own social networking profile on the site as well as in K-Ching, an on-line direct sale and auction marketplace.  Regular non-artist members can also sell used and new items on K-Ching and set up a store on their Kerchoonz profile. The company grew to 14,400,000 users in the space of two years. 

The site was created as 'an alternative to piracy'.

Profile
Kerchoonz.com is a music focused website with a social networking side to it, much like Bebo or MySpace.

Powered by ISRC codes: The ISRC (International Standard Recording Code) is the international identification system for sound recordings and music video recordings. Each ISRC is a unique and permanent identifier for a specific recording which can be permanently encoded into a product as its digital fingerprint. Encoded ISRC provide the means to automatically identify recordings for royalty payments.  Kerchoonz uses the ISRC to track and pay for downloads and streams.

History
Founders: Indiana Gregg and Ian Morrow. The site launched in beta in June 2008 with a £250,000 ($490,000) start-up co-investment from Scottish Enterprise and the Discovery Investment fund.  The company received a further £180k seed funding from the Discovery Investment Fund VCT and Scottish enterprise in February 2009. Kerchoonz was formed as an alternative to piracy.

Deals
In July 2009, Music Week and Billboard magazine announced a deal between Kerchoonz.com and Beggars Group that would allow circa 20,000 songs to be accessed from Rough Trade, 4AD, XL Recordings and Matador. This deal included prominent acts from the Beggars Roster such as Bon Iver, Jarvis Cocker, Vampire Weekend, British Sea Power, Cat Power, TV on the Radio, The Prodigy and Grammy Award winning Adele to name a few. Billboard announced that Kerchoonz had licensing deals with Beggars and 132 other independent labels. In a quote from Simon Wheeler, director of Beggars, he states,"We're committed to making our catalog available through as wide a range of services as possible,  Kerchoonz was constructed with artists' rights in mind and it is exactly the kind of company which the industry should support". Billboard also announced that Kerchoonz was also in negotiations with the major music labels.

The site originally had a joining fee of £12.50 per year; however, a freemium model was added in December 2008. Total Guitar magazine reports that the site is locked in talks with major record labels in order to provide a comprehensive music catalogue for fans. The same magazine reported that artist and bands were paid for streams of their music on the site.

Kerchoonz Live Sessions
The first Kerchoonz Live Sessions were announced by the company in December 2008. The online competition encourages artists to upload their music, get paid for their streams, and perform for a live studio audience to be broadcast across the web. Bands who participate in Kerchoonz Live Sessions benefit by receiving promotion in hard press, worldwide blog networking, professional live studio recordings and interview sessions with top journalists around the globe and cash prizes. The company filmed a series of 4 bands including Helicopter Girl

In July 2009, Music Week announced that Kerchoonz.com teamed up with Music online TV program Our House. Guests and celebrity presenters and live performances from acts including Frank Bembini of the Fun Lovin' Criminals, Kristina Miles and The 66 were announced among acts that to be aired weekly, with the first episode being shown on July 30, 2009.

Site functionality and sections

The Kerchoonz website is broken down into sections: Home, Music, Video, Talk, Biz, K-ching. The Following gives a brief explanation of these sections and how they work within the Kerchoonz portal.

K-ching
K-Ching is a 'social' ecommerce auction and buy-now storefront portal which provides users with an instant store on their profile as soon as they begin to sell products. Products for sale can instantly be shared to Facebook, Twitter and a number of other social media and bookmarking sites, as well as Kerchoonz, providing instant marketing for goods & services sold. Kerchoonz offers an online shop for bands, allowing bands to sell their digital downloads, and also their physical CDs, T-shirts, and old gear through their own social networking profile on the site as well as in K-Ching, an on-line direct sale and auction section to the site located at

Kerchoonz Music & Video
Kerchoonz Music section is free legal music streaming section whereby artists are compensated by opting into ad-supported streams of their music and on advertising revenues along with an annual administration fee paid by the artists and labels. Bands can sell their digital downloads and stream upload their music and videos for streaming. Bands are compensated for each stream by agreeing to the advertising share revenue agreement that is displayed in the footer of the site.

Talk
Talk is a section composed of blogs, a user contribution news section, and forums. User blogs update the Kerchoonz talk section whenever a new blog article is posted by a user. The user contribution based 'news' section called K-digz functions by allowing users to report media from around the web under the categories of World & Business, Music News, Entertainment, Music Reviews, Film & Theatre, Lifestyle, Sports, Video Blogs, Choonz Choice, Technology, Science, Gaming, weird News, Health Fitness & Beauty, and Fashion.

K-digz allows users to submit, comment and vote articles up the thread. Popular articles that receive more 'K-digz' move up the thread. The K-digz section has sharing features allowing users to re-post their favourite articles to other websites such as Twitter, Facebook and various social bookmarking sites.

The forum section operates similarly to traditional online forums.

Biz
Kerchoonz has a Business section titled 'Biz' which contains a business directory for music and music business related entries. Business members with Industry Pro accounts can list their business in this section and have access to details of other businesses. The Biz section also included a classified ads section.

Products

K-box

The K-box Gel audio speaker from Kerchoonz Ltd, is composed of a small speaker powered by an internal amplifier which when placed onto solid flat surfaces, walls or windows turns the surface into speakers or sound board. Its intended use is to amplify and provide stereo sound that is supplied by any audio source that has 3.5mm audio output.  The K-box can be utilized with contemporary electronics, like a computer, iPod, iPhone, television or portable gaming device. The K-box is about the size of a standard cell (mobile) phone.
The K-box uses a hybrid technology of standard speaker, delivering mid to high frequencies and a Gel Audio driver delivering low end Bass frequencies.  Gel audio is patented loudspeaker technology. When placed on flat solid surfaces, this technology enhances the bass response to improve the volume and audio quality.  The K-box gel audio technology has been explained as  “hydro-gel” suspension system used to improve the dynamics in comparison to similar speaker products which typically work on transduction.

The K-box is powered by a built-in rechargeable battery with up to 20 hours of playtime per charge. Recharged via computer USB or 5v adaptor.

Technical details

Hardware specs

Portable (115 x 55 x 20mm)
Up to 20 hours battery life (recharge via USB)

Package contents

K-box speaker Canvas case 3.5mm patch cable USB charge cable Instruction sheet

Loudspeakers
average spl 95 Db for 2W RMS Bass response 40H-20 kHz

Awards
The K-box received an award as runner-up as The Most Valuable Music Therapy Product of 2009 by The Therapy Times in July 2009.

References

British social networking websites
British music websites